Denis Dercourt (born 1 October 1964) is a French film director and screenwriter.

Biography 

Denis Dercourt's grandfather directed documentaries, his father was a film producer and his brother is also a film producer. From 1988 to 1993, Dercourt studied philosophy at the Paris Nanterre University and also studied at Sciences Po.

Dercourt started his career as a singer and violin player. He performed with the French symphonic orchestra directed by Laurent Petitgirard and taught music at the Conservatoire de Strasbourg. He shot his first short film with his brother.

He has directed nine films since 1997. His film La Tourneuse de pages was screened in the Un Certain Regard section at the 2006 Cannes Film Festival. Three years later, his film Demain dès l'aube competed in the same section at the 2009 festival.

In 2021, he shot the French-Korean film Vanishing based on the novel The Killing Room by Peter May.

Filmography

References

External links

1964 births
Living people
French film directors
French male screenwriters
French screenwriters
Writers from Paris